The men's 1,500m metres was an event at the 1972 Summer Olympics in Munich, West Germany. The final was held on Sunday 10 September 1972 and was contested by 10 athletes. The semi-finals were held on Saturday 9 September 1972 and were contested by 27 athletes. The heats were held on Friday 8 September 1972 and 71 athletes entered, with 66 runners from 46 nations competing. The maximum number of athletes per nation had been set at 3 since the 1930 Olympic Congress. The event was won by Pekka Vasala of Finland, the nation's first championship in the 1500 metres since back-to-back wins in 1924 and 1928. Kipchoge Keino of Kenya came half a second short of becoming the first man to successfully defend Olympic gold in the event; instead, his silver made him just the second man to win two medals of any color in the 1500 metres.

Background

This was the 17th appearance of the event, which is one of 12 athletics events to have been held at every Summer Olympics. All three medalists from 1968 (Kipchoge Keino of Kenya, Jim Ryun of the United States, and Bodo Tümmler of West Germany) returned, along with two other finalists: sixth-place finisher Jacky Boxberger of France and seventh-place finisher Henryk Szordykowski of Poland. Ryun "was no longer the dominant runner he had been in 1966–67," but was still the world record holder and had run the third-fastest mile ever between the Olympic trials and the Games. Keino and Ryun were favorites for the top two spots again, especially with their respective countrymen Ben Jipcho (who had played a strategic role helping Keino in the 1968 final, but was now a legitimate contender himself) and Marty Liquori out with injury. A third Kenyan, Mike Boit, was also a challenger, but was more of an 800 metres specialist. Rod Dixon of New Zealand and Pekka Vasala of Finland were also strong challengers.

Sixteen nations made their 1500 metres debut in 1972: Algeria, Burma, Cameroon, East Germany, Ghana, Liberia, Madagascar, Malawi, Nigeria, Panama, Portugal, Saudi Arabia, Somalia, Sudan, Tanzania, and Uganda. The United States made its 17th appearance, the only nation to have competed in the men's 1500 metres at each Games to that point.

Competition format

The competition was again three rounds (used previously in 1952, 1964, and 1968). The "fastest loser" system introduced in 1964, but not used in 1968, returned; once again the semifinals were balanced. Now, however, the semifinal heats and final were set at 10 men each, rather than the 8 or 12 previously.

There were seven heats in the first round, each with 10 or 11 runners (before withdrawals). The top four runners in each heat, along with the next two fastest overall, advanced to the semifinals. The 30 semifinalists were divided into three semifinals, each with 10 runners. The top three men in each semifinal, plus the fastest fourth-placer, advanced to the 10-man final.

Records

These were the standing world and Olympic records prior to the 1972 Summer Olympics.

No new world or Olympic records were set during the competition.

Schedule

All times are Central European Time (UTC+1)

Results

Round 1

Heat 1

Heat 2

Heat 3

Heat 4

Both Ryun and Fordjour fell when the latter clipped the former's heel, knocking both out of contention for advancement. The United States appealed, asserting that Ryun was tripped, but the appeal was denied.

Heat 5

Heat 6

Heat 7

Semifinals

Semifinal 1

Semifinal 2

Semifinal 3

Final

See also
 1978 Men's European Championships 1,500 metres (Prague)

References

 1
1500 metres at the Olympics
Men's events at the 1972 Summer Olympics